Janie McCarthy (1885 – 20 December 1964) was an Irish resistance worker during World War II in Paris, and language teacher.

Early life and education
Janie (sometimes recorded as Jane) McCarthy was born in Bohereengowan, Killarney, County Kerry. She was fourth of the eight children (six girls and two boys) of mason, Jeremiah, and Mary McCarthy. She was most likely educated locally, emigrating to France in 1910. Initially, she lived in Brittany working as an au pair, before moving to Paris. She attended to Sorbonne, studying French and English. McCarthy started a language school which developed a huge reputation with the children of royalty and European aristocracy attending.

Work in the French Resistance

At the outbreak of World War II, McCarthy destroyed her British passport to avoid the possibility of being imprisoned by German authorities. She joined the resistance and other related groups when France fell, she even started her own initiative in the Paris area. Her area of specialisation was in rescue work, saving a number of lives including members of the allied intelligence services and armies. Her method was simple, enrolling each refugee as a member of staff. Her riskiest gambit was bringing an American officer through a Gestapo inspection in the Paris metro, convincing the officers that he was as a deaf mute because he could not speak French. From 1940 to 1944, she only lost one refugee, a French double agent. She was also involved in intelligence gathering. While many of her counterparts were sent to concentration camps, McCarthy evaded detection for the entirety of the war. Her home at 64, rue Sainte-Anne acted as a safe house. She donated a large portion of her salary to fund a civilian camp at Saint Denis, the Military Hospital Val de Grace and the sanatorium at Brevannes.

Later life and death
McCarthy continued to teach her pupils after the war, bringing students to Kerry on summer trips. She even conducted language classes at her bedside in June 1964, as her health was failing. She was brought to the Hertfordshire British Hospital, Paris in November 1964, dying there on 20 December 1964. She was buried in Paris on 28 December. Her death was not noted in the Irish national newspapers, bar the Irish Times.

References

1885 births
1964 deaths
People from Killarney
Recipients of the Ordre des Palmes Académiques
Recipients of the Medal of Freedom
French Resistance members
Recipients of the Resistance Medal
Recipients of the Croix de Guerre (France)
Irish expatriates in France